Alberto Merciai (born June 9, 1900) was an Italian professional football player.

1900 births
Year of death missing
Italian footballers
Serie A players
Serie B players
Pisa S.C. players
Juventus F.C. players
ACF Fiorentina players
Association football midfielders